Ajay Baines (born March 25, 1978) is a Canadian former professional ice hockey player who played in the East Coast Hockey League and American Hockey League.  He played for the Greenville Grrrowl, Norfolk Admirals, Omaha Ak-Sar-Ben Knights, Hamilton Bulldogs, and Iowa Chops.

Awards and achievements
 Named to the WHL West Second All-Star Team in 1999

References 

1978 births
Canadian ice hockey centres
Greenville Grrrowl players
Hamilton Bulldogs (AHL) players
Iowa Stars players
Kamloops Blazers players
Living people
Norfolk Admirals players
Omaha Ak-Sar-Ben Knights players